Aetostreon is an extinct genus or subgenus within the genus Exogyra of fossil marine oysters in the family Gryphaeidae.

Select species 
 †Aetostreon latissimum (Lamarck, 1801)
 †Aetostreon pilmatuegrossum Rubilar & Lazo, 2009
 †Aetostreon subsinuatum (Leymerie 1842)

References 

Gryphaeidae
Prehistoric bivalve genera
Fossil taxa described in 1878